Wubb Idol is an American animated musical comedy television special based on this animated series Wow! Wow! Wubbzy!; it is the series' second film overall, after 2008's Wubbzy's Big Movie!, and consists of the episodes "Wubb Girlz Rule", "Wuzzleburg Idol", "Wubbzy's Big Makeover", and "The Big Wuzzlewood Concert". The movie originally aired on Nickelodeon in the United States on May 1, 2009, with an encore airing on Noggin two days later.

Wubb Idol follows protagonist Wubbzy and his friends as they meet the popular music group Wubb Girlz — consisting of Shine, Sparkle, and Shimmer — who choose him to perform at their concert in the city of Wuzzlewood (based on real-life Hollywood). American singer and actress Beyoncé guest starred as the voice of the Wubb Girlz's lead singer Shine, who was heavily featured in promotion for the film.

The DVD release of Wubb Idol also includes the episodes "Bye Bye Wuzzleburg", "Wubbzy's Wacky Journey", "Lights, Camera Wubbzy", and "A Wubbstar is Born".

Plot
The Wubb Girlz: Shine, Shimmer and Sparkle, are the most popular singing group of all time, who live in Wuzzlewood (Hollywood), and everyone in Wuzzleburg loves them—everyone except Wubbzy, who doesn’t know who they are. When it is announced that the Wubb Girlz are visiting Wuzzleburg, the townspeople plan a special welcome for them. However, when they go to the airport to greet the girls, they aren’t there. Meanwhile, Wubbzy, who is unaware of the girls’ visit, arrives at the train station to see some trains. One of the trains turns out to be the mode of transportation the Wubb Girlz have taken. Wubbzy thinks they’ve moved to Wuzzleburg, so he gives them a tour of the town, not knowing they're a band. Meanwhile, back at the airport, the townspeople realize their mistake, so they follow Wubbzy and the girls all day. That night, when they follow them to The Wubb Club, they finally find them. The Wubb Girlz announce that they will host the Wuzzleburg Idol Talent Show, the winner of which will fly with them back to Wuzzlewood to perform in their next concert. Wubbzy finally learns who they are. Though the welcome almost didn’t go as planned, the girls tell everyone that Wubbzy is a great tour guide and they love Wuzzleburg. Then they all head inside the clubhouse for a party, in celebration of the girls’ arrival.

On the day of the Talent Show, Wubbzy tries to find a talent he’s good at, but can’t do anything like the Wubb Girlz. The girls tell him to be himself and do whatever he does best, so he follows their advice. That night at the talent show, the Wubb Girlz are disappointed that most of the contestants are trying to emulate them. Wubbzy shows off an original talent and wins.

When they arrive in Wuzzlewood, they meet Stu, the Wubb Girlz’ agent, but when Stu meets Wubbzy, he tells him he doesn’t “look like a star”, and needs a new look to fit into town. Wubbzy dresses in a hip-hop outfit, Stu gives him a trio of fellow hip-hop dancers, and changes his name to Wubb-Z “Z”. However, it causes Wubbzy to act too cool and he starts calling Widget, Walden and Daizy, who came with him on the trip, his old friends, and abandons them. During the rehearsal for the concert, Wubbzy acts cool instead of acting like his old self, much to the Wubb Girlz’ dismay. While taking photos on his new motorcycle, Wubbzy accidentally turns it on, and flies up into the sky. He hangs his pants onto the edge of the Wuzzlewood Sign. He wants his fellow dancers to save him, but they refuse, stating he’s “un-cool!”. Luckily, Widget, Walden and Daizy rescue him in the WubbCopter. Back at the Wuzzlewood Bowl (Hollywood Bowl), Wubbzy apologizes for changing and he reconciles with his friends. Stu wants to do more work with him, but Wubbzy refuses, so Stu shrugs, and is back to his old self. Then they head backstage to finish rehearsing, and the Wubb Girlz are also happy he’s back to normal.

On the night of the concert, when famous news reporter Jann Starl (voiced by real-life Jann Carl) points out to Wubbzy he's going to perform in front of a huge audience, Wubbzy begins to have stage fright so his friends try to help cure his stage fright backstage before the show starts. The Wubb Girlz tell him they feel better whenever they have their friends around them so they invite Wubbzy's friends to perform with them in the concert. they accept, and they all deliver a great performance.

Premiere week
On April 27, 2009, a "premiere week" of new episodes was aired and lasted throughout April 30, before the actual movie premiere on May 1. This is a list of the individual episodes that aired. This schedule also reflects the end of Wow! Wow! Wubbzy! on Nickelodeon as part of its Nick's Play Date block.

External links

2009 films
2009 animated films
2009 television films
2000s American animated films
Television films based on television series
American flash animated films
American children's animated comedy films
American children's animated fantasy films
American children's animated musical films
American musical comedy films
Animated films based on animated series
Animated films about bears
Animated films about rabbits and hares
Animated films about friendship
Animated anthology films
Frederator Studios
2000s children's animated films